The ALCO boxcabs were diesel-electric switcher locomotives, otherwise known as AGEIR boxcabs as a contraction of the names of the builders. Produced by a partnership of three companies, ALCO (American Locomotive Company) built the chassis and running gear, General Electric the generator, motors and controls, and Ingersoll Rand the diesel engine. The principle of operation was the same as modern locomotives, the diesel engine driving a main generator of 600 volts DC with four traction motors, one per axle.

A total of 33 units were produced between 1925 and 1928. These were the first commercially successful production diesel-electric locomotives.

ALCO dropped out of the arrangement in 1928, acquired their own diesel engine manufacturer in McIntosh & Seymour and went on to start its own line of diesel switchers. The first ALCO boxcab switcher was outshopped in January 1931 and after a brief demonstration tour was sold to Jay Street Connecting. The ALCO Boxcab and two end cab switchers built in early 1931 used the McIntosh & Seymour 330 engine. This early development of end cab switchers led ALCO to build the HH series based on the McIntosh & Seymour 531 engine and using GE electrical components by mid-1931.

The five surviving examples of these earliest boxcabs can be found at the B&O Railroad Museum in Baltimore, MD (CNJ #1000 - the first), the National Museum of Transportation, St. Louis, MO (B&O #1/195/8000), the North Alabama Railroad Museum in Huntsville, Alabama (Union Carbide #3/11), the Illinois Railway Museum in Union, IL (DL&W #3001/IR #91), and the Henry Ford Museum in Dearborn, MI (IR #90).

The earliest boxcabs were often termed "oil-electrics" to avoid the use of the German name "Diesel", unpopular after World War I.

In fiction
In Thomas & Friends, the character Philip is based on an example of the ALCO boxcab. His design is modified to work on the NWR.

See also
GE boxcab, the continuation of this locomotive design after ALCO participation ceased.

References 

 The engine at North Alabama Railroad Museum in Huntsville, Alabama (Union Carbide #3/11) confirmed 20 March 2018 by visit by Mark Hillgartner, North Alabama Railroad Museum member.
 The engine at Museum of Transportation, St. Louis, MO (B&O #1/195/8000) confirmed 20 March 2018 by telephone call to Museum by Mark Hillgartner.
 The engine at Illinois Railway Museum in Union, IL (DL&W #3001/IR #91) confirmed 20 March 2018 by telephone call to Museum by Mark Hillgartner.
https://www.thedieselshop.us/Alco-GE_Boxcabs.HTML
 The engine at Henry Ford Museum (IR #90) confirmed 21 March 2018 by email from museum, which provided this link:   https://www.thehenryford.org/collections-and-research/digital-collections/artifact/37723/#slide=gs-197839

External links
ALCo-GE-IR Boxcabs Page

Diesel-electric locomotives of the United States
ALCO locomotives
General Electric locomotives
Rolling stock innovations
Standard gauge locomotives of the United States